Keith Agget (12 November 1931 − 4 May 2017) was an Australian former professional rugby league footballer who played in the 1950s. He played for the Parramatta Eels and the Balmain Tigers.

Sources
 Whiticker, Alan & Hudson, Glen (2006) The Encyclopedia of Rugby League Players, Gavin Allen Publishing, Sydney

References

1931 births
2017 deaths
Australian rugby league players
Parramatta Eels players
Balmain Tigers players
Rugby league players from Sydney